This page provides the summaries of the matches of the group stage of the Asian football qualifiers for 2008 Olympics.

Format
The 12 teams in this round were divided into three groups of four teams each and played on a home-and-away format. The group winner from each group advanced to the 2008 Summer Olympics Football tournament in Beijing.

Matches

Group A

Group B

Group C

Notes

External links 
 Official site of the AFC Men's Olympic Qualifiers

Afc, Men